Galium uliginosum or fen bedstraw is a plant species of the genus Galium. It is widespread across most of Europe as well as Morocco, Western Siberia, Turkey, Kazakhstan and Xinjiang. It is reportedly naturalized in New Zealand, Greenland and the Crozet Islands.

Galium uliginosum is a component of purple moor grass and rush pastures – a type of Biodiversity Action Plan habitat in the UK. It occurs on poorly drained neutral and acidic soils of the lowlands and upland fringe. It is found in the South West of England, especially in Devon.

Galium uliginosum is easily confused with marsh bedstraw, Galium palustre, but is distinguished from this species by having bristly edges on its leaves, and not turning black when it dries out. The leaves are arranged in whorls of 6 to 10 around the stem, which is a characteristic feature of the bedstraw genus Galium.

References

External links
 
Naturegate, Luontoportti, Helsinki, fen bedstraw
Northern Ireland Priority Species Galium uliginosum
Tela Botanica, Gaillet aquatique Galium uliginosum
Wilde Planten in Nederland en Belgie, Ruw walstro, Wrede tongblier, Fen Bedstraw, Gaillet aquatique, Moor-Labkraut
Besançon, Galium uliginosum Linné  Gaillet aquatique

uliginosum
Flora of Europe
Flora of Morocco
Flora of Siberia
Flora of Kazakhstan
Flora of Xinjiang
Flora of New Zealand
Flora of Greenland
Flora of the Crozet Islands
Plants described in 1753
Taxa named by Carl Linnaeus